Beth Elohim ( "House of God") may refer to the following Jewish synagogues:

Congregation Beth Elohim (Brooklyn, New York), a Reform synagogue founded in 1861
Congregation Kahal Kadosh Beth Elohim, a Reform synagogue founded in the 1740s in Charleston, South Carolina
Temple Beth Elohim (Georgetown, South Carolina), a Reform synagogue founded in 1904

See also